The Pitons are two mountainous volcanic plugs, volcanic spires, located in Saint Lucia. The Pitons are a World Heritage Site,  in size, and located near the town of Soufrière.

Geography
The Pitons are located near the towns of Soufrière, Saint Lucia, Soufrière, and Choiseul Quarter Choiseul on the southwestern coast of the island. They are in the electoral districts of three and ten. The Pitons are located on either side of Jalousie Bay.

Flora and fauna
Coral reefs cover almost 60% of the site's marine area. A survey has revealed 168 species of finfish, 60 species of cnidaria, including corals, eight mollusks, 14 sponges, 11 echinoderms, 15 arthropods, and eight annelid worms. The dominant terrestrial vegetation is tropical moist forest grading to subtropical wet forest, with small areas of dry forest and wet elfin woodland on the summits. At least 148 plant species have been recorded on Gros Piton, 97 on Petit Piton, and the intervening ridge, among them eight rare tree species. The Gros Piton is home to some 27 bird species (five of them endemic), three indigenous rodents, one opossum, three bats, eight reptiles, and three amphibians.

Geology
The volcanic complex includes a geothermal field with sulphurous fumaroles and hot springs.

Gros Piton
Gros Piton is at the southern end of Pitons Bay. It is the second-highest peak on Saint Lucia, after Mount Gimie.

Gros Piton can be climbed without ropes or mountaineering experience. One can hike to the summit and come back down to sea level within several hours. Local guides are provided by the National Park and are included with your entry fee. They are trained by the government to have basic knowledge of the languages common among tourists and of the medical procedures required in case of common accidents.

Petit Piton
Petit Piton lies towards the middle of Soufrière Bay, south of Soufrière and north of Gros Piton.

Petit Piton was first climbed in 1878 by Abdome Deligny. The islands of Dominica, Martinique, Barbados, and St. Vincent can be seen from its peak.

In popular culture
Saint Lucia's local brand of beer made by the Windward & Leeward Brewery is named after the Pitons.

Both mountains are an attraction for hikers although the Gros Piton peak is more popular since it is an easier climb and tours are offered by The Soufrière Foundation, a non-profit group that is dedicated to helping preserve the Pitons Management Area.

Gallery

See also
Geography of Saint Lucia

References

Volcanoes of Saint Lucia
Volcanic plugs of North America
Mountains of Saint Lucia
World Heritage Sites in Saint Lucia